Pedicularis sceptrum-carolinum, commonly known as moor-king or moor-king lousewort, is a plant species in the genus Pedicularis.

References

sceptrum-carolinum
Taxa named by Carl Linnaeus
Plants described in 1753